Wawrzyniec Benzelstjerna Engeström (1829–1910) was a Polish activist and poet. He was the son of General Stanislaus von Engeström and grandson of the diplomat Count Lars von Engeström.

1829 births
1910 deaths
Polish activists
Polish poets
Polish people of Swedish descent